Aleksei Ivanovich Bolshakov (born 25 May 1966) is a former Russian football player.

References

1966 births
Living people
Soviet footballers
FC Energiya Volzhsky players
FC Rotor Volgograd players
Russian footballers
FC Tekstilshchik Kamyshin players
Russian Premier League players
Russian expatriate footballers
Expatriate footballers in Kazakhstan
FC Mordovia Saransk players
FC Zhenis Astana players

Association football defenders